UC 3 (released 2004 in Oslo, Norway by Bergland Production/Bare Bra Musikk – BE0102) is a Jazz album by the Norwegian Jazz band Urban Connection.

Review 
Urban Connection comprises the jazz musicians Frode Nymo (saxophone), Steinar Raknes (bass) and Håkon Mjåset Johansen (drums).

The Norwegian Jazz magazine «Ballade» (Listen to Norway) critique Tomas Lauvland Pettersen, in his review of the Urban Connection album UC 3 states:

The magazine Down Beat in a review of the Urban Connection concert at Vossajazz 2012, states:

Reception 
The review by the Norwegian newspaper Adresseavisen awarded the album 5 stars (dice), the review by the Norwegian newspaper Bergens Tidende awarded the album 4 stars (dice), and the review by the Norwegian newspaper Smaalenenes Avis awarded the album 4 stars (dice).

Track listing 
«Nexus» (5:07)
«Oh Yeah!» (6:03)
«I Need an Exit» (5:31)
«Brannigans Law» (4:53)
«Show!» (7:15)
«The Black Meat» (4:36)
«Flower» (7:12)
«Interzone» (5:31)

Credits 
Alto Saxophone - Frode Nymo
Bass – Steinar Raknes
Drums – Håkon Mjåset Johansen

References

External links 
Frode Nymo on Myspace
Håkon Mjåset Johansen on Myspace
Steinar Raknes Official Website

Urban Connection albums
2004 albums